Ørebladet is a former Norwegian newspaper, issued from 1891 to 1924. Ørebladet became defunct in 1924, when it was incorporated in the newspaper Tidens Tegn. 

Among the journalists working for Ørebladet were Øvre Richter Frich, Sven Elvestad, Ernst G. Mortensen and Kitty Wentzel, and theatre critic Ludovica Levy.

References

1891 establishments in Norway
1924 disestablishments in Norway
Defunct newspapers published in Norway
Norwegian-language newspapers
Newspapers established in 1891
Publications disestablished in 1924